Xingjing may refer to:

Xingjing, Ningxia (兴泾), a town in Xixia District, Yinchuan, Ningxia Hui Autonomous Region, China
Hetu Ala, the capital of Later Jin (1616–1636), also known as Xingjing (興京) after 1636, located in Xinbin Manchu Autonomous County, Liaoning, China
Gun Metal Grey (刑警), a 2010 Hong Kong TV series
  - Xingjing, work on astronomy

See also
Xinjing (disambiguation)